Josiah Blackburn (6 March 1823 – 11 Nov. 1890) was a London born and educated journalist who emigrated to Canada West in 1850.

Background
Josiah was involved in the newspaper business by 1852. He and his brother John were working with the Paris Star  as well as the Ingersoll Chronicle. Also in 1852 he purchased the Canadian Free Press, a weekly in London, Canada West. On 5 May 1855 Blackburn began a daily edition, the London Free Press and Daily Western Advertiser (after 1872 - the London Free Press).

References 

 
 Ontario Historical Plaque - Josiah Blackburn

1823 births
1890 deaths
Writers from London, Ontario
19th-century Canadian journalists
Canadian male journalists
19th-century Canadian male writers